Cole Howard (born March 30, 1989) is a Canadian voice actor currently living in Vancouver, British Columbia. He voices for films, commercials, anime, cartoons, and video games. He was the voice lead in Bob's Broken Sleigh. He is also known for his performances as Kosuke Ueki from The Law of Ueki, Van Yamano from Little Battlers Experience and Lief from Deltora Quest.

Awards and nominations
Leo Awards 2016 - Best Performance in an Animation Program or Series° - Winner

Filmography

Animation
Action Dad — Jack Poundpenny
Barbie & Her Sisters in A Pony Tale — Jonas
Bob's Broken Sleigh — Bob
The Deep - Griffin
Fruit Ninja: Frenzy Force — Seb
GeofreakZ — M-Flip
The Little Prince — Nickel (B 356 episodes 11-12, The Planet of Jade)
Marvel Super Hero Adventures — Spider-Man
Mega Man: Fully Charged — Bert Wily, Peter Punkowski
My Little Pony: Friendship Is Magic — Terramar
The New Adventures of Peter Pan — Stringbean
Ratchet & Clank — Blarg
SheZow — Matt Wheeler/Armedmax, Ned Wallis/White Knight
Soggy Flakes — Dr. Birdberry 
Spider-Man Marvel Video Comics — Spider-Man
Superbook — Micah
The Dragon Prince — Crow Master
Ninjago (TV series) — Kataru, Benthomaar

Video games
D.I.C.E. (PlayStation 2) — Marco Rocca
Hogworld: Gnarts Adventure (iOS app) — Gnart
Mega Man Powered Up — Mega Man, Mega Man? 
Trinity: Souls of Zill Ơll — Zeraschel, Male Young 2
Zhu Zhu Pets: Kung Zhu — Private Abrams

Dubbing roles

Anime dubbing
B-Daman Fireblast — Novu Moru (Credited as Cole Hanson)
Beyblade Burst — Wakiya Murasaki (Seasons 1-2)
Cardfight!! Vanguard — Kyou Yahagi, Oracle
Cardfight!! Vanguard: Asia Circuit — Kyou Yahagi
Cardfight!! Vanguard G — Shion Kiba (Credited as Cole Hanson)
Cardfight!! Vanguard G GIRS Crisis — Shion Kiba, Kyou Yahagi (Credited as Cole Hanson)
Cardfight!! Vanguard G Stride Gate — Shion Kiba (Credited as Cole Hanson)
Deltora Quest — Lief, Evil Lief (Eps. 36-37)
D.I.C.E. — Clo-Zan
Di Gi Charat Nyo — Mjr. Coo Erhard/Young Yasushi
Dragon Ball Z Kai — Android 17 (Ocean Productions dub)
Full Moon O Sagashite — Machida
Future Card Buddyfight — Gayaoka, Magoroku Shido, Raita Niitani, Tasuku Ryuenji (Credited as Cole Hanson)
Future Card Buddyfight 100 — Gayaoka (ep 18); Kirikakure Saizo (ep 10); Magoroku Shido/Death Shido (19 episodes); Raita Niitani (eps 2-3, 22); Saizo (ep 15); Shinji (eps 4, 25); Tasuku Ryuenji (eps 1-25); Zepar (ep 12) (Credited as Cole Hanson)
Gintama° — Shinpachi Shimura
Hoop Days — Satoh
Little Battlers Experience series — Van Yamano (Credited as Cole Hanson)
Kingdom series — Xin, Sei Kyou (Seasons 1-2)
My-HiME — Takumi Tokiha
My-Otome — Takumi Tokiha
The Law of Ueki — Kosuke Ueki
Sinbad — Sinbad
Tide-Line Blue — Adjutant Teen Gould; Keel's Male Partner (Ep. 1)
Zoids Wild — Arashi

Video games dubbing
Gundam BEC (PlayStation 2) — Elijah
Mega Man Powered Up (PlayStation PSP) — Mega Man
Mobile Suit Gundam Seed: Never Ending Tomorrow (PlayStation 2) — Elijah Cole

References

External links

Cole Howard at CrystalAcids

Soggy Flakes video

1989 births
Living people
Canadian male stage actors
Canadian male video game actors
Canadian male voice actors
Male actors from Vancouver
Place of birth missing (living people)